The Enfants Noyés Nature Reserve (French: Réserve naturelle des Enfants Noyés, commonly called the Étangs des Enfants Noyés; Dutch: Vijvers van de Verdronken Kinderen) is a nature reserve consisting of three large ponds located in a valley of the Sonian Forest in Brussels. The nature reserve consists of three distinct ponds: The Étang du Fer à Cheval (The Horseshoe Pond), the Étang des Canards Sauvages (The Wild Ducks' Pond) and the Étang du Clos des Chênes (The Oak's Clos Pond).

History

Origins and name
The Réserve naturelle des Enfants Noyés is French for the Nature Reserve of the Drowned Children, but it owes its name to a mistake. A mill was once installed on the edge of the pond. It belonged to a certain Verdroncken (dutch for drowned). His children inherited it and got into the habit of calling it The mill of the Verdroncken children (Kinderen Verdroncken), until one day when a bad translation turned Kinderen Verdroncken into Verdronken Kinderen, which literally means drowned children.

Commercial use
By successive inheritance, the ponds became the property of the van der Meulen family, an important family of freshwater fish merchants in Brussels, many of whom were deans of the guild of freshwater fishmongers. They owned a large number of fishponds and ponds, especially in the Sonian Forest. Elisabeth Van der Meulen (1720–1769), wife of Jean-Baptiste van Dievoet (1704-1776), was the last owner of the ponds, it was she who sold them to the State in 1744.

Gallery

Archaeology
Archaeological traces of human settlements, stone axes, arrowheads, scrapers, hammers, as well as spherical vases with flared necks (preserved at the Royal Museums of Art and History) dating from 3,000 to 2,200 years BC were discovered between the valley of the nature reserve and the valley of Vuylbeek.

At that time, the Sonian Forest extended over most of Western Europe. Also not far from the ponds, multiple tumuli, probably built during the first millennium BC, are visible.

References

External links
 Bruxelles –- Environment File 
 Trivia on the name of the reserve

Year of establishment missing
Parks in Brussels
Nature reserves in Belgium